Alessandro "Alex" Puzar (born 19 November 1968) is an Italian former professional motocross racer. He competed in the Motocross World Championships from 1988 to 2009. Puzar is notable for being a two-time motocross world champion.

Biography
Puzar began his motocross Grand Prix career in 1988 riding a KTM. He was the 1990 F.I.M. world champion in the 250cc class on a Suzuki. In 1995 he won the 125cc motocross world championship on a Honda. Along with Andrea Bartolini and Alessio Chiodi, Puzar was a member of the winning Italian team in the 2002 Motocross des Nations.

References 

1968 births
Living people
Italian motocross riders
People from Ceva
Sportspeople from the Province of Cuneo